The Center for Middle East Policy ("CMEP", formerly the Saban Center for Middle East Policy) is a center for research within the Brookings Institution focused on the United States' involvement in the Middle East. It was founded in May 2002 .

Creation

Funding
The center was originally named after American-Israeli film and television producer Haim Saban. Saban, according to the center and its parent organization, "made a generous initial grant and pledged additional funds to endow the Center." According to a press release from Saban's charitable foundation, Saban "donated $13 million for the establishment of the Saban Center for Middle East Policy at the Brookings Institution." Saban, according to the center, ascribed his involvement to his "abiding interest in promoting Arab-Israeli peace and preserving American interests in the Middle East" that led him to fund the center.

Launch
The center was launched in May 2002 "with a special address by His Majesty King Abdullah II bin al-Hussein of the Hashemite Kingdom of Jordan to a select audience of policymakers in Washington, D.C."

People
Leadership
 Natan Sachs, Director and Fellow

Fellows
 Daniel L. Byman, Senior Fellow
Shadi Hamid, Senior Fellow
 Suzanne Maloney, Senior Fellow, and Vice President for Foreign Policy, Brookings
 Chris Meserole, Fellow
 Bruce Riedel, Senior Fellow

Criticism
Some critics have charged that various sources of funding for the center have influenced its outlook, but the center has dismissed such allegations, saying that in all cases the donors respected the center's independence.

John Mearsheimer and Stephen Walt, in their 2006 article wrote: "To be sure, the Saban Centre occasionally hosts Arab scholars and exhibits some diversity of opinion. Saban Center fellows ... often endorse the idea of a two-state settlement between Israel and the Palestinians. But Saban Center publications never question US support for Israel and rarely, if ever, offer significant criticism of key Israeli policies." Some Saban Center fellows have responded by criticizing the authors' scholarship and expansive definition of "Israel lobby." Martin Indyk stated that their "notion of a loosely aligned group of people that all happen to be working assiduously for Israel is indeed a cabal.... And this cabal includes anyone that has anything positive to say about Israel… And what does this cabal do? It ‘distorts’ American foreign policy, it ‘bends’ it, all these words are used to suggest that this cabal is doing something anti-American.” Another fellow wrote that the authors' book "will pale in comparison [to other academic works] because the only way it can become an esteemed classic is if its underlying thesis is correct: that a domestic political lobby drives U.S. policy in the Middle East. If that were true, then the ruckus raised by The Israeli Lobby would establish the book as a classic. But it isn’t true. Domestic politics and lobbying do matter when it comes to matters of tone and timing, but as Aaron David Miller, a veteran American peace-process diplomat, puts it...: “I can’t remember a single decision of consequence American peace process advisers made, or one we didn’t, that was directly tied to some lobbyist’s call, letter, or pressure tactic.”

In a September 17, 2014, article in Tablet, Lee Smith criticized the center for accepting substantial donations from the Qatari government, "a foreign government that, in addition to its well-documented role as a funder of Sunni terror outfits throughout the Middle East, is the main patron of Hamas—which happens to be the mortal enemy of both the State of Israel and Mahmoud Abbas’ Fatah party." He suggested that the donations influenced the center's research analysis and Martin Indyk's statements as a State Department official and peace mediator. Brookings responded: "A review of publications and media appearances by our scholars in Doha and in Washington—all of which are available at Brookings.edu—demonstrate the same independence of thinking and objective, fact-based analysis about Qatar as on every other topic of our research. Our agreements with Qatar specifically protect the independence of our scholarship in all respects." Smith thanked the think tank for its response, but said it did "not satisfactorily address the key issues [his] article raises."

References

External links
 Center for Middle East Policy – official website

Think tanks established in 2002
Foreign policy and strategy think tanks in the United States
United States–Middle Eastern relations
Israel–United States relations
Middle Eastern studies in the United States
Think tanks based in Washington, D.C.
2002 establishments in Washington, D.C.
Brookings Institution